Lecuona is a surname of Basque origin, from leku (place) and -ona (good). It can refer to the following people:

Ernestina Lecuona y Casado (1882–1951), Cuban composer and pianist 
Ernesto Lecuona (1895–1963), Cuban composer and pianist, brother of Ernestina 
Iker Lecuona (b. 2000), Spanish MotoGP rider
Margarita Lecuona (1910–1981), Cuban singer and composer 
Rafael A. Lecuona (1928–2014), Cuban gymnast, nephew of Ernestina and Ernesto
Ximena García Lecuona, Mexican-American screenwriter

References